Shien is a given/family name and may refer to:

 Chen Shien (born 1985), professional Go player
 Shien Biau Woo (born 1937), American professor and politician
 Shu Shien-Siu (1912–2001), Chinese/Taiwanese mathematician, engineer, and educator 
 Wang Chien-shien (born 1938), founder of the Chinese New Party

Characters
 Shien, a character in Fūma no Kojirō
 Shien, in the anime/manga Saiyuki
 Shien, in the video game Shien's Revenge (or Shien: The Blade Chaser)

See also
 
 
 Shin (disambiguation)
 Shine (disambiguation)